Balmullo (Gaelic: Baile Mhullaich) is a village in Fife, Scotland. Army base Leuchars Station is also nearby.

History
The name Balmullo derives from Celtic bāile "village" with mullaich "top". The village name was recorded as Beilmullhoh in 1282.

Now largely a dormitory settlement, it was once a weaving village. Balmullo was the home of the picture postcard cartoonist Martin Anderson ('Cynicus') whose red sandstone Cynicus Castle was demolished in 1939, seven years after his death.

Balmullo today
Balmullo benefits from a Spar grocery store which also doubles as a Post Office. Balmullo also has a pub; The Balmullo Inn public house.

The Balmullo Primary School is located in the heart the village. A village newsletter is also published online.

In 2002, the village appeared in news articles after a big cat was allegedly spotted nearby.

Industry

The quarry at Balmullo extracts orange-pink felsite (red pathway chippings), and lies to the west of the village. Minerals found here include azurite, baryte, malachite, metatorbernite, and pseudomalachite.

Transport
Nearby travel links are:
 Leuchars railway station,  
 Cupar railway station,  
 Dundee Airport,

References

External links

 Balmullo Community Council's Own Site
 Balmullo Community Council
 Balmullo Community Council's Newsletter

Villages in Fife